Warren Dow (January 12, 1905 – November 22, 1965) was an American fencer. He competed in the team foil event at the 1936 Summer Olympics.

Dow competed at the 1936 Summer Olympics in Berlin and after the war at the 1948 Summer Olympics in London, together with his wife, the former Helen Mrocckowska. Their son, Robert Dow, competed in the team sabre event at the 1972 Summer Olympics in Munich.

References

External links
 

1905 births
1965 deaths
American male foil fencers
Olympic fencers of the United States
Fencers at the 1936 Summer Olympics
Fencers at the 1948 Summer Olympics
Sportspeople from Paterson, New Jersey